Bairdsville is an unincorporated community on the border of Manalapan and Millstone townships in Monmouth County, New Jersey, United States. The community is centered on the intersection of Woodville Road (County Route 527A) and Baird Road. Near the site of Bairdsville in Millstone is the Thomas Baird Homestead, a home owned by one of the first families to settle in Millstone.

References

Millstone Township, New Jersey
Unincorporated communities in Monmouth County, New Jersey
Unincorporated communities in New Jersey